Simcoe may refer to:

Geography

Canada
 Simcoe, Ontario, a town in southwestern Ontario, near Lake Erie, Canada
 Simcoe County, a county in central Ontario, Canada
 Lake Simcoe, a lake in central Ontario, Canada
 Simcoe North, a federal and provincial electoral district in Ontario, Canada
 Former federal electoral districts in the province of Ontario, Canada:
 Simcoe South
 Simcoe East
 Simcoe Centre

Elsewhere
 Fort Simcoe, a former United States Army fort preserved as a state park near White Swan, Washington
 Simcoe, Missouri, a community in the United States
 Simcoe Mountains, an extinct volcanic region near Goldendale, Washington

People
John Graves Simcoe (1752–1806), British army officer, the first lieutenant governor of Upper Canada
 Elizabeth Simcoe (1762–1850), British artist and diarist, wife of John Graves Simcoe
 Anthony Simcoe (born 1969), Australian actor

Others
 Simcoe brand YCR 14 cv, a hop variety (Humulus lupulus)

See also
 Governor Simcoe Secondary School, a high school in St. Catharines, Ontario, Canada
 Simco (disambiguation)
 SIMCOS, a computer language and a development environment for computer simulation